Ponciano Mbomio (born 20 March 1976) is an Equatoguinean sprinter. He competed in the men's 4 × 100 metres relay at the 1996 Summer Olympics.

References

1976 births
Living people
Athletes (track and field) at the 1996 Summer Olympics
Equatoguinean male sprinters
Olympic athletes of Equatorial Guinea
Place of birth missing (living people)